Wayne Richard Radloff (born May 17, 1961) is a former professional American football offensive lineman who played five seasons for the Atlanta Falcons (1985–1989) in the National Football League.

1961 births
Living people
Sportspeople from London
English players of American football
American football centers
American football offensive guards
American football offensive tackles
Georgia Bulldogs football players
Michigan Panthers players
Atlanta Falcons players
San Francisco 49ers players